This is a list of Cork's record in the Munster and All-Ireland Senior Hurling Championship over the last few years.

Overview

2000s

1990s

1980s

1970s

1960s

1950s

Players

Most championship appearances

External links
 Cork GAA website

Records and statistics
County hurling team records and statistics